The Institute of Management Sciences (IMS Lahore), formerly known as Pak-American Institute of Management Sciences (Pak-AIMS), is a project of AKEF (Al Karim Educational Foundation) established in Lahore, Pakistan in 1987 which offers undergraduate and graduate programs in management and computer sciences.

The Rector of the institute is Khalid Ranjha in 2014. It is located in Gulberg, Lahore.

Pak-AIMS was issued 'No Objections Certificate (NOC)' by the University Grants Commission, now known as the Higher Education Commission (Pakistan) for the award of charter in 1995. Consequently, the institute was chartered as Institute of Management Sciences (IMS) by the Government of Punjab (Pakistan) under the Punjab Ordinance XXIII of 2002 and given degree-awarding status.

Government-recognized institution
Institute of Management Sciences has 1,400 students at two campuses and 110 faculty members, who teach 170 courses in trimesters. This institute is officially accredited and recognized by the Higher Education Commission of Pakistan.

Introduction and history
The institute was established in Lahore in 1986 as the Canadian School of Management - Lahore Learning Center. Later the name was changed to The Pak-American Institute of Management Sciences (Pak-AIMS) to reflect the institute's Articulation Agreement with the  College of Staten Island of City University of New York (CSI/CUNY), USA.

Campuses
 Main campus, Gulberg III, Lahore, Pakistan.

Departments
 Department of Computer Science
 Department of Management Sciences
 Department of Law
 Department of Physics
 Department of English literature
 Department of Mathematics

Bachelor's degrees offered
bachelor's in Computer Sciences
Bachelor of Business Administration
Bachelor of Information Technology
bachelor's in Computer Engineering
bachelor's in Software Engineering

Master's degrees offered
Master of Business Administration
master's in Computer Sciences
Master of Business Administration (Executive)
master's in History

Notable faculty
 Khalid Ranjha

References

External links
 Pak-AIMS website
 Location on map
 Higher Education Commission of Pakistan recognized universities list in Pakistan

Educational institutions established in 1987
Universities and colleges in Lahore
Business schools in Pakistan
1987 establishments in Pakistan